Tungsten borides are compounds of tungsten and boron. Their most remarkable property is high hardness. The Vickers hardness of WB or WB2 crystals is ~20 GPa and that of WB4 is ~30 GPa for loads exceeding 3 N.

Synthesis
Single crystals of WB2−x, x=0.07–0.17 (about 1 cm diameter, 6 cm length) were produced by the floating zone method, and WB4 crystals can be grown by arc-melting a mixture of elemental tungsten and boron.

Structure
WB2 has the same hexagonal structure as most diborides (AlB2, MgB2, etc.). WB has several forms, α(tetragonal), β (orthorhombic) and δ (tetragonal).

Properties
δ-WB and WB2 crystals have metallic resistivities of 0.1 and 0.3 mΩ·cm, respectively. The oxidation of W2B, WB and WB2 is significant at temperatures above 600 °C. The final oxidation products contain WO3 and probably amorphous B2O3 or H3BO3. The melting temperatures of W2B, WB and WB2 are 2670, 2655 and 2365 °C, respectively.

References

Tungsten compounds
Borides
Superhard materials